Alpha Academy are a professional wrestling tag team composed of Chad Gable and Otis. The team is currently performing in WWE on the Raw brand, where they are former one-time Raw Tag Team Champions. The pair are longtime best friends in real life, with their friendship dating back to 2011, where they trained for the Olympics together in Colorado Springs. The two are now neighbors on the same street.

History 
On November 13, 2020 episode of SmackDown, Chad Gable opened the "Alpha Academy" (a nod to his former tag team of American Alpha with Jason Jordan) and attempted to recruit Otis as his client. The team made their debut on the December 11 episode of SmackDown in a defeat to the team of Cesaro and Shinsuke Nakamura. At TLC: Tables, Ladders and Chairs, Gable and Otis teamed with Big E and Daniel Bryan to defeat Cesaro, Nakamura, King Corbin, and Intercontinental Champion Sami Zayn in an eight-man tag team match. On the February 19, 2021 episode of SmackDown, Gable ordered Otis to attack Rey Mysterio after their tag team match, thus turning them into heels.

As part of the 2021 Draft in October, now known as Alpha Academy, both Gable and Otis were drafted to the Raw brand. On the January 10, 2022 episode of Raw, Alpha Academy defeated RK-Bro (Randy Orton and Riddle) to win the WWE Raw Tag Team Championship. They would both enter in the Royal Rumble match, but they failed to win the match. On the March 7 episode of Raw, Alpha Academy dropped the titles back to RK-Bro, ending their reign at 55 days. On Day 2 of WrestleMania 38 on April 3, Alpha Academy failed to regain the titles from RK-Bro in a triple-threat match also involving the Street Profits (Angelo Dawkins and Montez Ford).

On the March 13, 2023 episode of Raw, Gable found Otis backstage taking part in a photo shoot with Maximum Male Models (the team of ma.çé and mån.sôör, managed by Maxxine Dupri). Otis decided to leave with Maximum Male Models instead of Gable, hinting at a breakup of the Alpha Academy.

Championships and accomplishments 
 Pro Wrestling Illustrated
 Ranked No. 69 of the top 500 singles wrestlers in the PWI 500 in 2020 (Otis)
 Ranked No. 123 of the top 500 singles wrestlers in the PWI 500 in 2020 (Chad Gable)
 WWE
 WWE Raw Tag Team Championship (1 time)

References

External links 
 Alpha Academy profile at Cagematch.net
 
 

WWE teams and stables